Georg Leibbrandt (6 September 1899 – 16 June 1982) was a Nazi German bureaucrat and diplomat. He occupied leading foreign policy positions in the Nazi Party Foreign Policy Office (APA) and the Reich Ministry for the Occupied Eastern Territories (RMfdbO) as an expert on issues relating to Russia. Both agencies were headed by Nazi ideologist Alfred Rosenberg. Leibbrandt was a participant of the January 1942 Wannsee Conference, at which the genocidal Final Solution to the Jewish Question was planned. In the postwar period, criminal proceedings against Leibbrandt were initiated, but the case against him was ultimately dismissed.

Early life 
Leibbrandt was born to ethnic German parents in Hoffnungstal (now Tsebrykove, Ukraine), near Odessa, in the Zebrikovo district of the Kherson Governorate of the Russian Empire. At an early age he emigrated to Germany for his studies.

In 1918, Leibbrandt studied theology in Germany, also taking classes in philology and history. In 1927, he was awarded a PhD He traveled extensively through the Soviet Union in 1926, 1928 and 1929.
 During his visits, he was variously represented as a doctor of philosophy, a post-graduate student, a professor of history from Leipzig University, and an employee of the Institute for the Study of Germans Abroad (Deutsches Ausland Institut) in Stuttgart. The official purposes of his visits were the study of the history of the development of German colonies in the Black Sea coastal region, and the gathering of historical information. As a result of his work, a book regarding emigrant movement of the Germans was published in Germany.

Leibbrandt had a talent for languages, which, coupled with a Rockefeller scholarship, enabled him to resume his studies in Paris and the United States from 1931-33. While in the US he actively kept contact with Germans from Russia who had also immigrated to America.

Nazi Party 
Leibbrandt accepted a request from Alfred Rosenberg (whom he resembled physically) in 1933 to return to Germany, and joined the Nazi Party that year. He was then named director of the Eastern Division of the Foreign Policy Office of the NSDAP. Leibbrandt was also placed in charge of anti-Soviet and anti-Communist propaganda. When the Soviet Union was invaded in 1941, and the Ministry for the Eastern Occupied Territories was established, Rosenberg chose Leibbrandt to direct the Political Department. Thus, Leibbrandt became the liaison for the Ukrainian, Caucasian, Russian and other groups of emigres.

Leibbrandt and Alfred Meyer attended the Wannsee Conference in 1942; both represented the Ostministerium. In the summer of 1943, for unknown reasons, he ceased his duties in the Ministry and joined the Kriegsmarine (German Navy).

Later life 
Leibbrandt was kept in Allied internment from 1945 to May 1949. In January 1950, he was formally charged with involvement in the destruction of Jews, by the Nuremberg Landgericht. The case against him was dismissed on 10 August 1950 and he was released from custody.

He then returned to America and resumed his earlier studies on the subject of the Russian Germans, making expert contributions to the Association of Germans from Russia (the Landsmannschaft der Deutschen aus Russland, which might be literally translated as the "Cultural Association of Germans from Russia") until his death in Bonn on 16 June 1982.

In 1979, Leibbrandt was barred from entering the United States by the U.S. Justice Department and State Department, for his participation in the murder of hundreds of thousands of Jews, in his position as Chief of the Political Division of the Reich Ministry for the Occupied Eastern Territories from 1941 to 1943.  His United States visa was revoked and his name was placed on the watch lists of the U.S. Immigration Service and State Department, so he could not enter the United States.

Leibbrandt has a son of the same name, living in Berlin.

Fictional portrayals 
In the 1984 television film, Die Wannseekonferenz, Leibbrandt was played by Jochen Busse.  In the 2001 HBO film Conspiracy, Leibbrandt was played by Ewan Stewart. In the 2022 ZDF television film, Leibbrandt was played by Rafael Stachowiak.

Literature 

 
 Leibbrandt, Georg. Die Sowjet-Union. Gegebenheiten und Möglichkeiten des Ostraums, 1943.

References 

1899 births
1982 deaths
People from Odesa Oblast
People from Tiraspolsky Uyezd
Ukrainian people of German descent
Russian and Soviet-German people
Emigrants from the Russian Empire to Germany
Nazi Party officials
Kriegsmarine personnel of World War II
Judges in the Nazi Party
Nazi Party politicians
German prisoners of war in World War II